Præstø is a town with a population of 3,857 (1 January 2022)  in Vordingborg Municipality in Region Sjælland on the east coast of the island of Zealand (Sjælland).

The islands of Maderne, Storeholm, and Lilleholm are part of the Præstø Fjord Wildlife reserves (Præstø Fjord Vildtreservat).

Jistory
Præstø became crown property in 1353. In 1304, it was incorporated as a market town.

Præstø was the seat of the former Præstø municipality (Danish, kommune). As of January 1, 2007, Præstø municipality ceased to exist as the result of Kommunalreformen ("The Municipality Reform" of 2007). It was merged with Langebæk, Møn, and Vordingborg municipalities to form an enlarged Vordingborg municipality. This created a municipality with an area of 615 km2 and a total population of 46,307 (2005). The municipality belongs to the new Region Sjælland ("Zealand Region").

The former Prøstø municipality covered an area of 107 km2, and had a total population of 7,608 (2005). Its last mayor was Ole Møller Madsen, a member of the Venstre (Liberal Party) political party.

Education

Bosei Sports High School, a folk high school, is located in Præstø, in the former Tokai University Boarding School in Denmark campus. The Tokai school was a Japanese boarding school.

Zenvo
The supercar company Zenvo Automotive is headquartered here. They are known for making the Zenvo STI

Notable people 

 N. F. S. Grundtvig (1783–1872) a Danish pastor, author, poet, philosopher, historian, teacher and politician. In 1821 he was granted the country living of Præstø and stayed a year.
 Pauline Worm (1825–1883) a Danish writer, poet, schoolteacher and feminist, a private tutor in Præstø 1847-1851
 Henry Johnson (1854 in Amendrup near Præstø – 1941) an American farmer, logger, businessman and politician, emigrated 1873. 
 Karl Adolph Gjellerup (1857 in Roholte vicarage at Præstø – 1919) a Danish poet and novelist, shared the Nobel Prize in Literature in 1917
 Henrik Grønvold (1858 in Præstø – 1940) a Danish naturalist and artist, known for his illustrations of birds
 Knud Olsen (1919 in Præstø – 2010) a builder and designer of boats, designed the OK Dinghy.
 Poul Thomsen (1922 in Præstø – 1988) a Danish film actor

See also
 Nysø Manor
 Oremandsgaard

External links

 Vordingborg municipality's official website (Danish only)
 Præstø commune (Archive)

References

 Municipal statistics: NetBorger Kommunefakta, delivered from KMD aka Kommunedata (Municipal Data)
 Municipal mergers and neighbors: Eniro new municipalities map

Former municipalities of Denmark
Cities and towns in Region Zealand
Vordingborg Municipality